Calamares is a free and open-source independent and distro-agnostic system installer for Linux distributions.

About 
Calamares is used by CachyOS, Garuda Linux, Manjaro, Netrunner, KaOS, KDE neon, Lubuntu, Sabayon Linux, Chakra, EndeavourOS, Peppermint OS, Artix Linux, OpenMandriva Lx , Q4OS, the Live medium of Debian, and several less known Linux distributions. It also has been used to automate the installation of command line distributions and to make custom distros.

Development was started in 2014 by Manjaro community member Teo Mrnjavac “with support from Blue Systems” and then picked up by KaOS.

The Calamares installer is in place of Ubiquit which works along with Ubuntu. With using Calamares, the company will not be issuing any new ISO images with the software.

Calamares is currently maintained by the Calamares team, most of which are KDE Developers and has no exclusive association with any Linux distribution. Calamares is not a KDE, KaOS or Manjaro project.

Configuration 
Calamares is very configurable using a mix of code modules and built in tools. Distro developers can add their own branding and configuration to Calamares. However, some distro makers opt to leave the installer to its default look feel and options.

See also 
 Anaconda
 YaST
 Debian-Installer
 Ubiquity

References 

Free software programmed in C++
Free software programmed in Python
Linux installation software
Software that uses Qt